Pelteobagrus is a genus of bagrid catfishes found in eastern Asia. The taxonomy of this genus is unclear and many authorities treat it as a junior synonym of Tachysurus and the type species of the genus, is Silurus calvarius which is a synonym of Tachysurus fulvidraco.

Species 
There are currently four described species in this genus:
 Pelteobagrus eupogon (Boulenger, 1892)
 Pelteobagrus intermedius (Nichols & C. H. Pope, 1927)
 Pelteobagrus nudiceps (Sauvage, 1883)
 Pelteobagrus tonkinensis V. H. Nguyễn, 2005
 Pelteobagrus ussuriensis (Dybowski, 1872) (Ussuri catfish)

References

Bagridae
Fish of Asia
Catfish genera
Freshwater fish genera
Taxa named by Pieter Bleeker